DoNotPay is a legal services chatbot. The chatbot was originally built to contest parking tickets, but has expanded to include other services as well. As a "robot lawyer," DoNotPay is a downloadable mobile application that claims to make use of artificial intelligence to provide legal services, with a subscription cost of $36 every three months. It is currently available in the United Kingdom and United States (in all 50 states). In 2021, DoNotPay raised $10 million by investors including Andreesen Horowitz, Lux Capital, Tribe Capital and more reaching a valuation of $210 million.

Services
DoNotPay started off as an app for contesting parking tickets. It sells services which generate documents on legal issues ranging from consumer protection to immigration rights; it states that these are generated via automation and AI. The company claims its application is supported by the IBM Watson AI.

DoNotPay states that its services help customers seek refunds on flight tickets and hotel bookings, cancel free trials, sue people, offer legal services relating to social issues such as asylum applications and housing for the homeless, seek claims from Equifax during the aftermath of its security breach, provide automated services to users seeking to obtain U.S. visas and green cards. DoNotPay offers a Free Trial Card feature which gives users a virtual credit card number that can be used to sign up for free online trials (such as Netflix and Spotify). As soon as the free trial period ends, the card automatically declines any charges. DoNotPay also claims that its services include the ability to automatically apply for refunds, cancel subscriptions, get hassle-free trials, fight spam in people's in boxes, combat volatile airline prices, and file damage claims with city offices.

Reception 
In 2016, Browder, the company's founder, told The Guardian that the chatbot had contested more than 250,000 parking tickets in London and New York and won 160,000 of them, all free of charge, claiming a success rate of over 60 percent, although the newspaper did not appear to verify the claim.

Browder's technology has received mixed reviews. For example, a blog post from The Guardian noted that it "just drafted an impressive notice under the Data Protection Act 1998 not to use my personal information for direct marketing." Similarly, a writer with The American Lawyer noted that, "one of DoNotPay's chatbots helped me draft a strong, well-cited and appropriately toned letter requesting extended maternity leave." 

However, Legal Cheek tested the service in 2016 with "fairly basic legal questions" and noted that it failed to answer most of them. Above the Law noted that the service may "be too good to be true" due to errors in the legal advice provided and "things as important as securing immigration status, which is one of the services DoNotPay promotes, mistakes can ruin lives." They recommended the service for "clear-cut issues like parking tickets or non-critical matters" but cautioned against it for legal issues with high stakes.

In 2023, Browder claimed that the organization would attempt to use DoNotPay live in court, but was forced to halt after being warned about the unlicensed practice of law. NPR wrote that "some observers" have had "mixed to shoddy results attempting to use its basic features", and noted that Browder, the company's founder, is known for attention-seeking stunts.

See also
Artificial intelligence and law
Computational law
Lawbot
Legal expert systems
Legal informatics
Legal technology

References

External links
 

Applications of artificial intelligence
2015 introductions
Legal software